The 1953 Navy Midshipmen football team represented the United States Naval Academy (USNA) as an independent during the 1953 college football season. They began the season ranked 13th in the pre-season AP Poll. The team was led by fourth-year head coach Eddie Erdelatz.

Schedule

Personnel

References

Navy
Navy Midshipmen football seasons
Navy Midshipmen football